The Roman Warm Period, or  Roman Climatic Optimum, was a period of unusually-warm weather in Europe and the North Atlantic that ran from approximately 250 BC to AD 400. Theophrastus (371 – c. 287 BC) wrote that date trees could grow in Greece if they were planted but that they could not set fruit there. That is still the case today, which implies that South Aegean mean summer temperatures in the 4th and the 5th centuries BC were within a degree of modern ones. That and other literary fragments from the time confirm that the Greek climate was basically the same then as around 2000. Tree rings from the Italian Peninsula in the late 3rd century BC indicate a time of mild conditions there around the time of Hannibal's crossing of the Alps with imported elephants in 218 BC.

Dendrochronological evidence from wood found at the Parthenon shows variability of climate in the 5th century BC, which resembles the modern pattern of variation.

Cooling at the end of the period is noted in Southwest Florida, which may have been caused by a reduction in solar radiation reaching the Earth. That may have triggered a change in atmospheric circulation patterns.

The phrase "Roman Warm Period" first appears in a 1995 doctoral thesis. It was popularized by an article published in Nature in 1999.

More recent research, including a 2019 analysis based on a much larger dataset of climate proxies, has found that the putative period, along with other warmer or colder pre-industrial periods such as the "Little Ice Age" and "Medieval Warm Period," were regional phenomena, not globally-coherent episodes.

Proxies

Pollen
A high-resolution pollen analysis of a core from Galicia concluded in 2003 that the Roman Warm Period lasted from 250 BC to AD 450 in northwestern Iberia.

Glaciers
A 1986 analysis of Alpine glaciers concluded that the period from AD 100 to 400 was significantly warmer than earlier and later centuries. Artifacts recovered from the retreating Schnidejoch glacier have been taken as evidence for the Bronze Age, Roman, and Medieval Warm Periods.

Deep ocean sediment
A 1999 reconstruction of ocean current patterns, based on the granularity of deep ocean sediment, concluded that there was a Roman Warm Period, which peaked around AD 150.

Mollusk shells
An analysis of oxygen isotopes found in mollusk shells in an Icelandic inlet concluded in 2010 that Iceland experienced a warm period from 230 BC to AD 140.

See also
Climate of ancient Rome

Notes

References
. Corrigendum: .
.
 .
.
.

.
.
.
.
.
.

 



1990s neologisms
1995 introductions
1995 in science
History of climate variability and change
1st millennium BC
1st millennium in Europe
Climate of Europe